Species Macaca mulatta
Family Cercopithecidae
 Order Primates
Gestation 165 days

Dates in days

References 
Ashwell, K.W., Waite, P.M. and Marotte, L., 1996. Ontogeny of the projection tracts and commissural fibres in the forebrain of the tammar wallaby (Macropus eugenii): timing in comparison with other mammals. Brain Behav. Evol. 47, pp. 8–22.
Clancy, B., Kersh, B., Hyde, J., Darlington, R.B., Anand, K.J.S., Finlay, B.L., 2007. Web-Based Method For Translating Neurodevelopment From Laboratory Species To Humans. Neuroinformatics. 5, pp. 79-94.
Dunlop, S.A., Tee, L.B., Lund, R.D. and Beazley, L.D., 1997. Development of primary visual projections occurs entirely postnatally in the fat-tailed dunnart, a marsupial mouse, Sminthopsis crassicaudata. J. Comp. Neurol. 384, pp. 26–40.
Finlay, B.L. and Darlington, R.B., 1995. Linked regularities in the development and evolution of mammalian brains. Science 268, pp. 1578–1584.
Rakic, P., 1974. Neurons in rhesus monkey visual cortex: systematic relation between time of origin and eventual disposition. Science 183, pp. 425–427.
Robinson, S.R. and Dreher, B., 1990. The visual pathways of eutherian mammals and marsupials develop according to a common timetable. Brain Behav. Evol. 36, pp. 177–195.

See also
 Brain development timelines
 Neural development
 http://www.translatingtime.net Translating Time: A website providing translation of brain developmental times among different species

Vertebrate developmental biology
Embryology of nervous system
Developmental neuroscience
Animal nervous system